Rocky Peeters (born 18 August 1979) is a Belgian professional football manager and former professional footballer, who is currently assistant coach of the Belgium U19s.

References

External links
Guardian Football

1979 births
Living people
Belgian footballers
Belgian football managers
Belgian expatriate footballers
K.S.V. Roeselare players
Sint-Truidense V.V. players
Beerschot A.C. players
K.V.K. Tienen-Hageland players
Belgian Pro League players
Challenger Pro League players
Cypriot First Division players
Enosis Neon Paralimni FC players
Expatriate footballers in Cyprus
People from Herentals
Association football midfielders
K.R.C. Zuid-West-Vlaanderen players
Footballers from Antwerp Province